Erdem ba Shazhan (translation of the name: "Science and Religion") was an anti-religious magazine in the Buryat-Mongolian language in the Mongolian script. The magazine was published by decision of the regional committee of the RCP(b) of May 8, 1928. It was the central publication of the Republican League of Atheists of the Buryat-Mongol Autonomous Soviet Socialist Republic. The magazine was published in Verkhneudinsk. In 1928, 3 issues of the magazine were published, in 1929 − 6 issues, in 1930 and 1931 − 9 numbers, in 1932 − 5 numbers, in 1934 − 2 numbers. The organizer and first editor of the magazine was Bato-Dalai Togmitov (1905 or 1906 -1938), who at that time worked as a researcher in the scientific committee of the republic. The magazine published materials explaining the policies of the cultural revolution, the fight against religion and the promotion of atheism among the Buryat population. The magazine published works of Buryat literature. In 1928, Abiduyev’s poem “Airplane” was published in the magazine.

References

Notes

 А.Д. ЖАЛСАРАЕВ. РОССИЯ И БУДДИСТЫ БУРЯТИИ. 1917—2014. ЧАСТЬ 2 Взаимоотношения государственных органов России с буддистами Бурятии с 1917 г. по 2014 г. (часть 2)
 Периодическая печать СССР 1917-1949. Том 1. Библиографический указатель. Издательство: М:, Всесоюзной книжной палаты . Год: 1958. / Стр. 87

1928 establishments in the Soviet Union
1934 disestablishments in the Soviet Union
Anti-religious campaign in the Soviet Union
Anti-Christian sentiment in Asia
Atheism publications
Buryat language
Critics of Buddhism
Magazines established in 1928
Magazines disestablished in 1934
Magazines published in Moscow
Persecution of Muslims
Propaganda in the Soviet Union
Propaganda newspapers and magazines
Religious persecution by communists
Magazines published in the Soviet Union
Anti-Islam sentiment in the Soviet Union